Hostile Planet is an American documentary series that premiered on the National Geographic channel on 1 April 2019. Directed by Guillermo Navarro with narration from Bear Grylls, the series draws attention to accounts of animals that have adapted to different environments.

References 
 https://open.spotify.com/album/2WVVTyRrtRywybJTNpLf33?si=4GbeLLJQSVOvZm-wBTSx7w

External links  

 Hostile Planet on IMDb

2010s American documentary television series
2019 American television series debuts
2019 American television series endings